6-MAPDB (1-(2,3-dihydrobenzofuran-6-yl)-N-methylpropan-2-amine) is a chemical compound which might be an entactogenic drug. It is structurally related to drugs like 6-APDB and 6-MAPB, which have similar effects to MDMA and have been used as recreational drugs. 6-MAPDB has never been studied to determine its pharmacological activity, though it is the N-methyl derivative of 6-APDB which is known to be a selective serotonin releaser.

Legality
6-MAPDB was banned in the UK in June 2013 as a temporary class drug along with 9 other related compounds, despite having never been sold as a street drug itself. This was due to concerns that it would have similar effects to drugs such as 6-APB that had been widely sold already, and 6-MAPDB might therefore be likely to become used recreationally also, if it were not banned preemptively.

See also
 5-MAPDB
 5-MAPDI
 IBF5MAP

References

Methamphetamines
6-Benzofuranethanamines
Designer drugs
Entactogens and empathogens